NGC 373 is an elliptical galaxy located in the constellation Pisces. It was discovered on December 12, 1876 by John Louis Emil Dreyer. It was described by Dreyer as "very faint, very small."

References

External links
 

0373
18761212
Pisces (constellation)
Elliptical galaxies
003946